Leo II (Levon I. Metsagorts; 1150 – 2 May 1219), also Leon II, Levon II or Lewon II, was the tenth lord of Armenian Cilicia or “Lord of the Mountains” (1187–1198/1199), and the first king of Armenian Cilicia (sometimes as Levon I the Magnificent or Lewon I) (1198/1199–1219). During his reign, Leo succeeded in establishing Cilician Armenia as a powerful and a unified Christian state with a pre-eminence in political affairs. Leo eagerly led his kingdom alongside the armies of the Third Crusade and provided the crusaders with provisions, guides, pack animals and all manner of aid. Under his rule, Armenian power in Cilicia was at its apogee: his kingdom extended from Isauria to the Amanus Mountains.

In 1194–1195, when he was planning to receive the title of king, he instituted a union of the Armenian church with Rome. With the signing of the Act of Union, his coronation proceeded without delay. He was consecrated as king on 6 January 1198 or 1199, in the Church of Holy Wisdom at Tarsus. His accession to the throne of Cilicia as its first Armenian monarch heralded into reality not merely an official end to Cilicia's shadowy umbilical connection to the Byzantine Empire, but also a new era of ecclesiastical co-operation with the West. A skilled diplomat and wise politician, Leo established useful alliances with many of the contemporary rulers; he also gained the friendship and support of the Hospitallers and the Teutonic Knights by granting considerable territories to them.

He envisioned annexing the Principality of Antioch to his kingdom, thus reinforcing his authority along much of the northeastern Mediterranean coastline. Levon first put this plan into action in 1194 by seizing the strategic fortress of Baghras after Saladin, the Sultan of Egypt and Syria, had abandoned it. His greatest triumph was achieved at the beginning of 1216 when at the head of his army he occupied Antioch and installed his grandnephew, Raymond-Roupen as its head. Raymond-Roupen remained in power until Leo's death. The transformation of the Armenian court, following the pattern of the Frankish courts, proceeded at a more rapid pace after Leo came to power. Many of the old names of specific functions or the titles of dignitaries were replaced by Latin ones and the changes in nomenclature were often accompanied by changes in the character of these offices.

Commerce was greatly developed during the reign of Leo: he granted charters regarding trade and commercial privileges to Genoa, Venice and Pisa. These charters provided their holders with special tax exemptions in exchange for their merchandising trade. They encouraged the establishment of Italian merchant communities in Tarsus, Adana and Mamistra, and became a large source of revenue for the growth and development of Cilician Armenia.

Early years
He was the younger son of Stephen, the third son of Leo I, lord of Armenian Cilicia. His mother was Rita, a daughter of Sempad, Lord of Barbaron. Leo's father, who was on his way to attend a banquet given by the Byzantine governor of Cilicia, Andronicus Euphorbenus, was murdered on  7 February 1165. Following their father's death, Leo and his elder brother Roupen lived with their maternal uncle, Pagouran, lord of the fortress of Barbaron, protecting the Cilician Gates pass in the Taurus Mountains.

Their paternal uncle, Mleh I, lord of Armenian Cilicia had made a host of enemies by his cruelties in his country, resulting in his assassination by his own soldiers in the city of Sis in 1175. The seigneurs of Cilician Armenia elected Leo's brother, Roupen III to occupy the throne of the principality. In 1183, Hethum III of Lampron, allied with Prince Bohemond III of Antioch, began joint hostilities against Roupen III who sent Leo to surround Hethum's mountain lair. But Bohemond III, rushing to the aid of Hethum, treacherously made Roupen prisoner.

His brother's absence gave Leo the opportunity to put his sharp political skills to practice as the interim guardian of the Roupenian House. Roupen's release required payment of a large ransom and the submission of Adana and Mamistra as vassalages to Antioch. When Roupen returned from captivity, he transferred the power to his brother, Leo (1187), and retired to the monastery of Trazarg.

His rule

Prince of Cilicia
The menace of the recent alliance between the Byzantine Emperor Isaac II Angelos and Saladin, and the more immediate threat of the Turkomans, led to a rapprochement between Leo and Bohemond III: on his accession Leo sought an alliance with the prince of Antioch and recognized his suzerainty. Large bands of the nomad Turkomans had been crossing the northern borders, advancing almost as far as Sis and laying waste on all sides; the two princes joined to beat off a Turcoman raid in 1187. Leo could muster only a small force, but he attacked them with such energy that he routed the bands, killed their leader, and pursued the fugitives as far as Sarventikar, inflicting heavy losses on them. Soon afterward (between 3 February 1188/4 February 1189), Leo married Isabella, a niece of Bohemond III's wife Sibylla.

The following year (1188), taking advantage of the troubled condition in the Sultanate of Rum that preceded the death of Kilij Arslan II, Leo turned against the Seljuks. A surprise attack on Bragana was unsuccessful, but Leon returned two months later with a larger army, killed the head of the garrison, seized the fortress and marched into Isauria. Though we find no specific mention of it, Seleucia must have been captured about this time. Proceeding northwards, Leo seized Heraclea, gave it up after payment to him a large sum, and advanced as far as Caesarea.

About the same time, he lent a large sum of money to Bohemond III, but the latter showed no haste to repay the loan. When Saladin invaded Antiochene territory, Leo remained neutral.

The Holy Roman Emperor, Frederick I Barbarossa approached the Armenian territories in June 1190, and Leo sent an embassy with presents, ample supplies, and armed troops. A second embassy, headed by the bishop Nerses of Lampron, arrived too late, after the death of the emperor (10 June 1190) and returned to Tarsus with the emperor's son Frederick, the bishops, and the German army. Nevertheless, Leo participated in the wars of the crusaders: his troops were present at the siege of Acre, and on 11 May 1191 he joined King Richard the Lionheart of England in the conquest of Cyprus.

Baghras and Antioch

Leo was the intent, at the same time, upon ensuring the security of his own realm, and some of his actions undertaken for this purpose ran counter to the interests or aspirations of his neighbors. In 1191, Saladin dismantled the great fortress of Baghras, which he had captured from the Templars. Soon after his workmen had left Leo reoccupied the site and rebuilt the fortress. This brought to a head the growing antagonism between Leo and Bohemond III, and the possession of Baghras was to be one of the principal points of contention in the long struggle between Cilicia and Antioch. Bohemond III demanded its return to the Templars and, when Leo refused, complained to Saladin. Saladin himself had objected to Leo's holding Baghras, which lay on the route from Cilicia to Antioch.

Soon after the death of Saladin, in October 1193, Leo invited Bohemond III to come to Baghras to discuss the whole question. Bohemond III arrived, accompanied by his wife, Sibylla, and her son, and accepted Leo's offer of hospitality within the castle walls. No sooner had he entered than he was taken prisoner by his host, with all his entourage, and was told that he would be released only if he yielded the suzerainty over Antioch to Leo. Leo hoped to gain release from homage to Bohemond III, and to seize Antioch; therefore, Leo took Bohemond's family and court off to Sis as prisoners.

Bohemond III agreed to surrender Antioch in exchange for his freedom, sending the Marshal Bartholomew Tirel and Richard L’Erminet to turn the city over to Armenian troops under Hethum of Sassoun. When the delegation arrived at Antioch, the barons there were ready to accept Leo as overlord, and allowed Bartholomew Tirel to bring the Armenian soldiers into the city and establish them in the palace.

However, after their initial entry, Antiochene resistance was spurred by the clergy and the Greeks. A riot began in the palace and spread through the city; the Armenians left and prudently retired with Hethum of Sassoun back to Baghras. The citizens of Antioch, under the Latin Patriarch of Antioch, Aimery of Limoges, formed a commune which recognized Bohemond III's eldest son, Raymond as lord until his father should be released.

Antioch then asked aid of King Henry I of Jerusalem and Count Bohemond I of Tripoli (the latter was Bohemond III's younger son). Early next spring, King Henry I sailed to Tripoli, where young Bohemond joined him, and then went on to Antioch and Sis. Leo, unwilling to face an open war, met him before Sis, ready to negotiate a settlement. Bohemond III renounced his as a suzerain, and in return for this was allowed to go back to Antioch without paying a ransom. Arrangements were also made for the marriage of Raymond of Antioch to Leo's niece, Alice. However, Raymond soon died and Bohemond III sent Alice back to Leo with her infant son Raymond-Roupen. Leo determined that this great-nephew of his should inherit Antioch on the death of Bohemond III.

Coronation

Leo pressed with renewed energy his claims for a royal crown, seeking the assistance of the two most powerful rulers of the time, the pope and the Holy Roman emperor. He sent to Emperor Henry VI, but the emperor prevaricated because he hoped to come soon to the East and he would look into the Armenian Question then.

So Leo approached Pope Celestine III; but the pope required submission of the Armenian church to Rome, and this created considerable difficulty; there was marked opposition from the majority of the clergy and the people of Cilicia. The bishops called together by Leo at first refused the papal demands, and are said to have agreed to them only after Leo told them that he would submit merely in word and not in deed.

The Byzantine emperor, Alexios III Angelos, hoping to retain some influence in Cilicia, sent Leo a royal crown, which was gratefully received. In 1197 Leo sent an embassy to Constantinople composed of Bishop Nerses of Lampron and other dignitaries; all of the discussions centered on religious questions, and the sending of the embassy was the last of several fruitless efforts to achieve a union between the two churches.

Meanwhile, Emperor Henry VI also promised a crown to Leo, in return for recognition of his suzerain rights over Armenia. Henry VI never visited the East; but soon after his death, his chancellor, Bishop Conrad of Hildesheim, came with the Papal legate, Archbishop Conrad of Mainz to Sis. Leo was crowned on  6 January 1198 (or 1199) at Tarsus, in the presence of the Armenian clergy, the Franco-Armenian nobility of the land, the Greek archbishop of Tarsus, the Jacobite patriarch, and the caliph’s ambassadors. While he was crowned by the catholicos, Gregory VI Abirad, Leo received the other royal insignia from Archbishop Conrad of Mainz. There was great rejoicing among the Armenians, who saw their ancient kingdom restored and renewed in the person of Leo.

Antiochene War of Succession

Archbishop Conrad of Mainz hastened from Sis to Antioch, where he obliged Bohemond III to summon his barons and make them swear to uphold Raymond-Roupen's succession. The barons had sworn allegiance to Raymond-Roupen, but his succession to Antioch was opposed by Bohemond III's second son, Count Bohemond of Tripoli, by the Templars, and by the commune, which was hostile to any Armenian interference. Bohemond of Tripoli was determined to secure the succession to Antioch, and at once refused to acknowledge the validity of the oath sworn in favor of his nephew.

In 1198, while az-Zahir, the emir of Aleppo preoccupied Leo, Bohemond of Tripoli entered Antioch, summoned the commune, and persuaded it to renounce in his favor its oath to his father. Within three month, however, Leo settled his Moslem troubles, made peace with the military orders and marched on Antioch. There was no resistance to his army or to its restoration of Bohemond III.

Meanwhile, the Templars brought all their influence to bear on Rome; but Leo ignored hints from the Church that he should restore Baghras to them. Leo invited Bohemond III and the Latin Patriarch of Antioch, Peter II of Angoulême to discuss the whole question; but his intransigence drove even the Patriarch over to Bohemond of Tripoli's side.

In April 1201, Bohemond of Tripoli, informed of his father's illness, rushed to Antioch, arriving on the day of the funeral. He immediately demanded recognition as the rightful heir and Bohemond IV was accepted as prince. But many of the nobility, mindful of their oath and fearful of Bohemond IV's autocratic tastes, fled to Leo's court at Sis. Leo heard of the death of Bohemond III late, but then hurried to Antioch with Alice and Raymond-Roupen to claim it for his great-nephew. When he found Bohemond IV already installed, he sent back for reinforcements, while Bohemond IV called for Aleppo. Az-Zahir invaded Cilicia in July 1201, and Leo had to abandon his siege of Antioch.

The war against the Sultanate of Rum was renewed by Leo in 1202 who ignored the peace treaty sent by Süleymanshah II. During the following summer King Amalric II of Jerusalem intervened; accompanied by the papal legate, cardinal Sofred of Saint-Praxedis, the masters of the Hospital and the Temple, and the high barons of the kingdom, he induced Leo to grant a short truce. After Leo had agreed to accept the decision of the barons and legate, the barons announced that the question at issue was purely one of feudal law in which the legate should have no say. Angered, Leo ended the truce and on  11 November 1203 entered the city and asked the patriarch to arrange peace between him and the commune. Bohemond IV who had been forced to leave Antioch to defend Tripoli during the feudal rebellion of Renart of Nephin was at Tripoli at that time, but the commune and the Templars held the citadel in Antioch stoutly and were able to expel the Armenians. Their appeals to Aleppo were answered when az-Zahir started again into Cilicia. Leo left Antioch in December when az-Zahir's army reached the Orontes River. Thereafter until 1206, when Bohemond IV was able to return to Antioch from Tripoli, Antioch was more or less protected from Leo by the watchfulness of az-Zahir. In the spring of 1206, Az-Zahir sent fresh contingents and assumed their command in person. Victorious at first, Leo had to retreat before the superior forces when the Antiochene armies joined Muslims. An eight-year truce was signed.

Meanwhile, “injurious information” was reported to him about his queen; Leo, therefore, had numerous members of her suite put to death and attacked her personally before imprisoning her in the fortress of Vahka on 27 January 1205/28 January 1206, where she was poisoned one year later.

Bohemond IV, however, deposed the Latin Patriarch of Antioch and summoned the titular Greek Patriarch, Symeon II to take his place. The unpopularity of Bohemond IV's behavior made it possible for Leo to plan a revolt within the city. Led by the Latin Patriarch Peter II and dissatisfied Latin nobles, the city rose, and Bohemond IV took refuge in the citadel. Leo entered with some of his army, just as Bohemond IV felt strong enough to emerge and crush the revolt. Leo had held Antioch only a few days.

Pope Innocent III handed the responsibility of settling the struggle to the Patriarch of Jerusalem, Albert who was a friend of Bohemond IV's allies, the Templars. The Patriarch offended Leo by insisting that the first preliminary to any settlement must be the return of Baghras to the Templars. In 1208 Leo angrily devastated the country round Antioch. But Bohemond's danger in Antioch in 1208 induced az-Zahir once more to invade Cilicia in 1209. The Seljuk Sultan, Kai-Kushrau I, whom Leo had befriended earlier and received at his court, also made a sudden attack and seized the fort of Pertous. Leo had to agree to return Baghras to the Templars and renounce his claims to Antioch. But Leo's attempts to keep the fortress of Baghras, despite his promise in the treaty with az-Zahir to return it to the Templars, led to a war in Cilicia and in the Antiochene plain.

In Cyprus between 28 January 1210/27 January 1211 Leo married Sibylle, the half-sister of King Hugh I of Cyprus.

In 1211, the master of the Temple was wounded in an ambush, and Pope Innocent III published the old ex-communication against Leo. Meanwhile, Bohemond IV agreed to accept a new Latin Patriarch in Antioch; Leo, therefore, forgot his obedience to Rome. He welcomed the Greek Patriarch of Antioch, Symeon II to Cilicia, and he gave much of the Latin church lands there to the Greeks. Leo also sought to tie the Hospitallers closer to him by giving them Seleucia, Norbert (Castrum Novum), and Camardias, thus constituting a march on the western borders of Cilicia and thereby protecting the country from Seljuks. The Teutonic Knights received Amoudain and neighboring castles; the master of the order may even have resided in Cilicia for a while.

In 1211, King John I of Jerusalem and Bohemond IV both gave the Templars such effective aid that Leo finally returned the Baghras. But the new treaty was abruptly broken the next year with further actions against the Templars. This time the interdict against Leo was strictly enforced.

Leo was reconciled with Rome in March 1213 after he had promised that he would help in the coming Crusade. He also won the favor of King John I, who in 1214 married Leo's daughter Rita and expected to inherit Armenia.

In Antioch, the population felt deserted by Bohemond IV, who preferred to reside in Tripoli, and Leo's intrigues rebuilt a strong party in favor of Raymond-Roupen. Bohemond IV was in Tripoli when the plot reached fruition. On the night of 14 February 1216 Leo managed by a successful intrigue, in which the Latin Patriarch Peter undoubtedly helped, to lead Armenian troops into Antioch and to occupy the city.

Raymond-Roupen then paid homage to Patriarch Peter and was consecrated prince of Antioch. In his joy at the successful outcome of the long war, Leo at last gave back Baghras to the Templars and restored the Latin church lands in Cilicia. But he paid for his victory by losing fortresses in the west and across the Taurus Mountains to the Seljuk Prince Kaykaus I. in 1216. These fortresses were Faustinepolis, Herakleia and Larende, were conquered from Seljuks in 1211.

Last years
When King Andrew II of Hungary, having fulfilled his Crusader vow, took his troops northward in January 1218, and traveled to Cilician Armenia. There marriage was arranged between Andrew's son, Andrew, and Leo's daughter, Isabelle.

Shortly afterward, Raymond-Roupen even quarreled with Leo. In 1219, Antioch sent for its old prince while Raymond-Roupen first sought refuge in the citadel, only to leave it to the Hospitallers and flee to Cilicia. There he found Leo still unwilling to forgive him, although on his deathbed. Before Leo died, he had named his young daughter Isabel as his rightful heir and had released the barons from the oaths of allegiance to Raymond Roupen.

His body was buried at Sis, but his heart and entrails were buried at the convent of Agner.

Marriages and children
# (1)  3 February 1188 – 4 February 1189, divorced 1206: Isabelle (? – Vahka, 1207), a daughter of a brother of Sibylle, the wife of Bohemond III of Antioch
Rita (Stephanie) (after 1195 – June 1220), the wife of King John I of Jerusalem
# (2)  28 January 1210 – 27 January 1211: Sibylla (1199/1200 – after 1225), a daughter of King Amalric I of Cyprus and Isabella I of Jerusalem
Queen Isabella I of Cilicia ( 27 January 1216 – 25 January 1217 – Ked,  23 January 1252)

Footnotes

Sources
 Edwards, Robert W., The Fortifications of Armenian Cilicia, Dumbarton Oaks Studies XXIII, Dumbarton Oaks, Trustees for Harvard University, 1987, Washington, D.C.; . 
 Ghazarian, Jacob G: The Armenian Kingdom in Cilicia during the Crusades: The Integration of Cilician Armenians with the Latins (1080–1393); RoutledgeCurzon (Taylor & Francis Group), 2000, Abingdon;

External links
Greeks, Crusaders, and Moslems — Rise of Leon II (Kurkjian's History of Armenia, Chs. 28–29)

|-

|-

1150 births
1219 deaths
 Monarchs of the Rubenid dynasty
12th-century Armenian people
13th-century Armenian people
 Kings of the Armenian Kingdom of Cilicia